Minuscule 392 (in the Gregory-Aland numbering), Θε23 (Soden), is a Greek minuscule manuscript of the New Testament, on parchment. Paleographically it has been assigned to the 12th century. 
It has marginalia.

Description 

The codex contains the text of the four Gospels on 385 parchment leaves. It is written in one column per page, in 36 lines per page. It contains the commentary of Theophylact.

It is a minuscule portion of the same codex to which belongs uncial codex 054 (first six pages).

The order of the Gospels is an unusual: Matthew, Luke, Mark, John (as in codex 498).

Text 

The Greek text of the codex is a representative of the Byzantine text-type. Aland placed it in Category V.

According to the Claremont Profile Method it represents mixed Byzantine text in Luke 1 and textual family Kx in Luke 10 and Luke 20.

History 

The manuscript was added to the list of New Testament manuscripts by Scholz (1794–1852).
C. R. Gregory saw it in 1886.

The manuscript is currently housed at the Vatican Library (Barberini gr. 521, fol. 7-391) in Rome.

See also 

 List of New Testament minuscules
 Biblical manuscript
 Textual criticism

References

Further reading 

 

Greek New Testament minuscules
12th-century biblical manuscripts
Manuscripts of the Vatican Library